Tossal Gros de Vallbona is a mountain of the Catalan Central Depression, Catalonia, Spain. It has an elevation of 802 metres above sea level.

This mountain is the highest summit of the Serra del Tallat; it is located between the municipal limits of Espluga de Francolí, Conca de Barberà and Vallbona de les Monges, Urgell.

See also
Catalan Pre-Coastal Range
Mountains of Catalonia

References

Mountains of Catalonia
Conca de Barberà